İbriktepe is a village in the district of İpsala, Edirne Province in northwestern Turkey. Population of İbriktepe is 1.492 as 2012. Before the 2013 reorganisation, it was a town (belde).

İbriktepe is famous for having been the birthplace of Albanian politician and founder of the Albanian Orthodox Church, Fan Noli. At the time of Noli's birth a small Albanian-speaking Orthodox community lived in the town. It had an Ayos Georgios church built in 1837. A bust of him was placed in the town in January 2011.

Today, the village formerly known as Qyteza is partly inhabited by Alevi Turks.

References

Villages in İpsala District